FK Gorno Lisiče is a football club from Gorno Lisiče in Skopje, Republic of Macedonia. They currently play in the 3.MFL (North).

History
The club played its first match in 1940 under the name Lisiče against Lebane from Leskovac. Over the years, the team has used a few different names, first Udarnik and later Bratstvo Edinstvo. For a period of time it also used the name Tehnokom, a firm that saved the club when it was in financial trouble. After the sponsor left only with the help of the Gorno Lisiče citizens, players and club board, it was saved from the brink of extinction.

Today, the club uses the name FK Euromilk Gorno Lisiče and successfully competes in the Macedonian Second League.

Recent seasons 

1The 2019–20 and 2020–21 seasons were abandoned due to the COVID-19 pandemic in North Macedonia.

Current squad
As of 9 September 2017

References

External links
Club info at MacedonianFootball 
Football Federation of Macedonia 

Football clubs in Skopje
Association football clubs established in 1964
1964 establishments in the Socialist Republic of Macedonia